Amelita Galli-Curci Estate, also known as Sul Monte, is a historic country estate located near Fleischmanns, New York, straddling the boundaries of Delaware County and Ulster County, New York. The architect Harrie T. Lindeberg (1879–1959) designed it as a country home for Italian operatic soprano Amelita Galli-Curci (1882–1963).  The estate has seven contributing buildings and two contributing structures.  The main house, built in 1922, is large and rambling, two-stories high, with multiple wings that wrap around a central courtyard. The structure is wood-frame construction sitting on a concrete foundation, its  walls clad in variegated stone, stucco and wood, and its steeply-pitched roof clad with cedar shingles.  Other contributing buildings and structures include the swimming pool, stone gateposts, sheds, caretaker's cottage and dairy barn.  Galli-Curci sold the estate in 1937.

It was listed on the National Register of Historic Places in 2010.

See also
National Register of Historic Places listings in Delaware County, New York

References

National Register of Historic Places in Delaware County, New York
Houses completed in 1922